Chorkesar is an urban-type settlement in Namangan Region, Uzbekistan. It is part of Pop District. The town population in 1989 was 1382 people.

In 2021 preparations for the environmental remediation a nearby former uranium mine, and also at Yangiabad, started with the assistance of a €2 million grant from the European Bank for Reconstruction and Development.

References

Populated places in Namangan Region
Urban-type settlements in Uzbekistan